Pontremoli railway station (Stazione di Pontremoli) is a station that serves the Italian town of Pontremoli and the municipalities of the upper Lunigiana, Zeri, Mulazzo and Filattiera. It is located on the Parma–La Spezia railway.

History
The station was extended in 1907.

Buildings and infrastructure 
The station building is a two-storey building. The lower storey is used for various offices, the waiting room and the bar. The upper storey contains the station master's apartment. The three access doors to the passenger building from Piazzale Bruno Raschi are covered by a wrought iron canopy. The station has seven platforms, five of which are used for passengers and two for freight transport and the stabling of rolling stock. The station has shelters for all five platforms, and has recently been equipped with a modern underpass.

Rail services
All passenger trains that pass through the station stop at it.

Services 
The station, which RFI manages and classified in 2008 in the silver category, has:
  ticket office
  ticket machines
  waiting room
  bar
  toilets

Interchange 
  taxi rank
  bus stop (TEP).

References

Footnotes

Sources
 
 
 
 

Railway stations in Tuscany
Railway stations opened in 1888